Zeppelin is a type of rigid airship.

Zeppelin may also refer to:

Arts and entertainment
Zeppelin (film), a 1971 British film
Zeppelin (video game), a 1994 flight and economic simulation game
The Zeppelin, a 1933 painting by Carel Willink
Led Zeppelin, a British rock band
The Zeppelin Record, a 1998 album by Dogbowl
"Zeppelin", a 2015 song by Sam and the Womp

Businesses and organisations
Zeppelin Foundation, a philanthropic organisation
Luftschiffbau Zeppelin ('building of airships'), a former German airship manufacturer 
Zeppelin-Staaken, a former German aircraft manufacturer
Zeppelin Games, former name of Eutechnyx, a British video game developer

People
Count Ferdinand von Zeppelin (1838–1917), German officer, inventor of the Zeppelin rigid airship
Zeppelin (surname), including a list of people with that name

Places
Zeppelin (bunker), World War II bunker near Zossen, Germany
Zeppelin (research station), Svalbard, Norway
Zeppelin (shopping centre), shopping mall in Kempele, Finland
Zeppelin Field, Nazi Party rally grounds in Nuremberg, Germany
Zeppelin University, a university at Friedrichshafen, Germany
Zeppelinhamna ('Zeppelin Cove'), Spitsbergen island, Svalbard, Norway
Zeppelinfjellet, ('Zeppelin Mountain'), Spitsbergen island, Svalbard, Norway
Mount Zeppelin, an Antarctic mountain

Transportation
Zeppelin NT, a modern class of helium-filled airships 
, a passenger liner launched in 1914 as SS Zeppelin
Maybach Zeppelin, a luxury car 1928–34
Rail zeppelin, experimental railcar which resembled a zeppelin airship in appearance

Other uses
Zeppelin (iPod speaker system), a Bowers & Wilkins product
Zeppelin (typeface), from the Klingspor Type Foundry
Zeppelin bend, a general purpose bend knot
Zeppelin loop, a loop knot
Zeppelin mail, airmail carried on Zeppelins
Cepelinai ('zeppelins'), a traditional Lithuanian dish of stuffed potato dumplings

See also

Graf Zeppelin (disambiguation)
Operation Zeppelin (disambiguation)
Zeppelin Museum (disambiguation)
Zepelin, a municipality in Rostock district, Mecklenburg-Vorpommern, Germany
ZEPLIN-III, a dark matter experiment